Blood–brain barrier disruption is the surgical process whereby drugs are used to create openings between cells in the blood–brain barrier.

Purpose 
The blood–brain barrier (BBB) is protected by a network of blood vessels and tissue that shields it from harmful substances. This protection also stops anti-cancer drugs from getting to the brain. To treat brain tumours and other brain related diseases, blood–brain barrier disruption is needed for the anti-cancer drugs to be infused into an artery that goes to the brain.

Effects 
Studies have shown that blood–brain barrier disruption can cause diseases in the central nervous system.

References 

Central nervous system
Neurosurgical procedures